The Jewish Cemetery of Funchal is a Jewish cemetery located in Rua do Lazareto, Funchal, Madeira. Sephardi Jews as well as Ashkenazi Jews are buried here.

History

The cemetery was built in 1851, the last burial took place in 1976.

Jews from Morocco arrived in 1819 and set themselves up in the cloth and wine trades. The Abudarham family were involved in the Madeira wine industry from the early 1860s onwards.

The Jewish community grew due to the Evacuation of the Gibraltarian civilian population during World War II to Madeira, which included a number of Jews, some of which are buried in the Jewish Cemetery.

Tito Benady, a historian on Gibraltar Jewry, noted that when some 200 Jews from Gibraltar were evacuated as non combatants to Funchal, Madeira, at the start of World War II, they found a Jewish cemetery that belonged to the Abudarham family. The same family after whom the Abudarham Synagogue in Gibraltar was named.

Interments

 Salomon Abudarham
 Clara Abudarham
 Reina Abudarham
 Joseph Abudarham
 Simy Abudarham
 Rafael Menahem Abudarham
 Jacob Abudarham
 Fortunato Abudarham
 Messod Alazar
 Mary Athias
 Emma Bach
 Samuel Benady
 Dona Bentata
 Rosa Benyunes
 Abraham Benzecry
 Jeannette Edith Boujou
 Joana Sultan Camara
 David Cohen
 Ester Esnaty
 Haim Esnaty
 Moises Ezagui
 Adolphus Friesner
 Albert Morse Goldberg
 Ester Hassan
 Hermann Horwitz
 Willy Alexander Katz
 Mordejay Labos
 Estrela Labos
 Harry Harry Lorie
 Margit Neugarten
 Abraham Robins
 Menahem Rodriguez Mercado
 Mordechai Rodriguez Mercado
 Pauline Plinette Schnitzer
 Gilbert Schnitzer
 Willy Schnitzer
 Ferdinand Schwartzschild
 Baruj Tobelem

Gallery

See also
 Synagogue of Funchal
 History of the Jews in Madeira

References

External links
 

1851 establishments in Portugal
Ashkenazi Jewish culture in Africa
Cemeteries in Madeira
Funchal
Gibraltarian diaspora
Jewish cemeteries in Portugal
Jews and Judaism in Madeira
Moroccan diaspora in Europe
Moroccan-Jewish diaspora
Sephardi Jewish culture in Africa